Carleigh DeWald is an American former Paralympic athlete who competed at international track and field competitions. She is a Parapan American Games silver medalist and she competed at the 2012 Summer Paralympics.

DeWald was named High School Female Track Athlete of the Year in 2012 following her success at the Paralympics.

References

Living people
Sportspeople from Canby, Oregon
Track and field athletes from Oregon
Paralympic track and field athletes of the United States
Athletes (track and field) at the 2012 Summer Paralympics
Medalists at the 2011 Parapan American Games
Year of birth missing (living people)